Thomas Bolton Shotts (October 1, 1902 – May 7, 1950) was an American football player and coach. He served as the head football coach at Jacksonville State University–then known as Jacksonville State Teachers College–from 1931 to 1937. He was a graduate of Auburn University, where he selected to the 1927 College Football All-Southern Team as a fullback.

Head coaching record

References

External links
 

1902 births
1950 deaths
American football fullbacks
Auburn Tigers football players
Jacksonville State Gamecocks football coaches